White Glacier  is a broad westward flowing tributary glacier which joins the Land Glacier on the north side of Mount McCoy in Marie Byrd Land. Mapped by United States Geological Survey (USGS) from surveys and U.S. Navy air photos, 1959–65. Named by Advisory Committee on Antarctic Names (US-ACAN) for General Thomas D. White, United States Air Force (USAF), Chief of Staff and member of the Joint Chiefs of Staff, 1957–61, who participated in the planning and organizational stages of Operation Deep Freeze in an administrative capacity and in matters relating to aircraft. Application of the name was proposed by Admiral Richard E. Byrd.

References

Glaciers of Marie Byrd Land